Joshua Jacobs (born February 11, 1998) is an American football running back for the Las Vegas Raiders of the National Football League (NFL). He played college football at Alabama and was drafted by the Raiders in the first round of the 2019 NFL Draft.

Early years
Jacobs attended McLain High School in Tulsa, Oklahoma. During his high school football career, he had 5,372 yards and 56 touchdowns for the Titans. He committed to the University of Alabama to play college football.

Jacobs was homeless in middle school. At the end of his rookie season in the NFL, he was featured reflecting on his homeless experience in a Kia commercial that aired during Super Bowl LIV.

College career
As a freshman at Alabama in 2016, Jacobs split time with Damien Harris and Bo Scarbrough, rushing 85 times for 567 yards and four touchdowns. As a sophomore in 2017, he had 284 yards on 46 carries with one touchdown. After the season, it was revealed that he had been playing on a broken ankle for most of the season. As a junior, he was named the MVP of the 2018 SEC Championship Game against the Georgia Bulldogs after rushing for 83 yards with two touchdowns.

College statistics

Professional career

The Oakland Raiders selected Jacobs in the first round with the 24th overall pick in the 2019 NFL Draft. Jacobs was selected with one of the first-round picks acquired from the Chicago Bears in the September 2018 Khalil Mack trade. He signed his four-year rookie contract with the team on July 9, 2019.

2019 season
Jacobs made his NFL debut in Week 1 against the Denver Broncos on Monday Night Football. In the game, Jacobs rushed 23 times for 85 yards and two touchdowns and caught one pass for 28 yards in the 24–16 victory. In the next game against the Kansas City Chiefs, he rushed 12 times for 99 yards as the Raiders lost by a score of 28–10. Three weeks later against the Chicago Bears at Tottenham Hotspur Stadium, Jacobs rushed 26 times for 123 yards and two touchdowns and caught three passes for 20 yards in the 24–21 win. One of those touchdowns was the first in the new stadium.  During Week 7 against the Green Bay Packers, he rushed 21 times for 124 yards in the 42–24 road loss. Two weeks later against the Detroit Lions, Jacobs rushed 28 times for 120 yards and two touchdowns in the 31–24 victory. After just the eighth game of the season, Jacobs set the Raiders rookie record for rushing yards in a season with 740, surpassing Marcus Allen's old record of 697. In the next game against the Los Angeles Chargers on Thursday Night Football, Jacobs rushed for 71 yards and the game-winning touchdown and caught five passes for 30 yards. In Week 11 against the Cincinnati Bengals, Jacobs rushed 23 times for 112 yards in the 17–10 win.  In Week 13 against the Kansas City Chiefs, Jacobs rushed 17 times for 104 yards in the 40–9 loss. During the game, Jacobs became the first running back in Raiders' history to rush for 1,000 yards in a rookie season. Jacobs missed three of the last four games of the season due to a shoulder injury and skin infection. Jacobs finished the 2019 season with 1,150 rushing yards and seven rushing touchdowns. He was named to the NFL All-Rookie Team. He was named the PFWA Offensive Rookie of the Year. He was ranked 72nd by his fellow players on the NFL Top 100 Players of 2020.

2020 season

Jacobs made his return from injury in Week 1 against the Carolina Panthers. During the game, Jacobs rushed 25 times for 93 rushing yards and three rushing touchdowns in the Las Vegas Raiders' 34–30 victory. Jacobs also contributed several key plays in the passing game with 46 yards on four receptions. In the following week's game against the New Orleans Saints on Monday Night Football, Jacobs recorded 105 all purpose yards (88 rushing, 17 receiving) during the 34–24 win. In Week 5 against the Kansas City Chiefs, Jacobs rushed for 77 yards and two touchdowns in the 40–32 win. In Week 8 against the Cleveland Browns, Jacobs rushed for a career-high 128 yards on 31 carries in the team's 16–6 win. In Week 9 against the Los Angeles Chargers, Jacobs rushed for 65 yards and a rushing touchdown from 14 carries in the team's 31–26 win, making Jacobs the new franchise leader in rushing yards through his first two seasons. In Week 10 against the Denver Broncos, Jacobs rushed 20 times for 112 yards and two rushing touchdowns during the team's 37–12 win. In Week 15 against the Los Angeles Chargers on Thursday Night Football, Jacobs recorded 114 yards from scrimmage and a rushing touchdown during the 30–27 overtime loss. In the 2020 season, Jacobs finished with 273 carries for 1,065 rushing yards and 12 rushing touchdowns to go along with 33 receptions for 238 receiving yards. He was named to the Pro Bowl. He was ranked 68th by his fellow players on the NFL Top 100 Players of 2021.

2021 season
Jacobs scored two rushing touchdowns in the Week 1 overtime victory over the Baltimore Ravens. In Week 16, against the Denver Broncos, Jacobs had 27 carries for 129 rushing yards in the 17–13 victory. In Week 18, against the Los Angeles Chargers, he had 26 carries for 132 rushing yards and one rushing touchdown in the 35–32 overtime victory. He finished the 2021 season with 217 carries for 872 rushing yards and nine rushing touchdowns to go along with 54 receptions for 348 receiving yards. In the Wild Card Round, Jacobs had 127 scrimmage yards in the 26–19 loss to the Cincinnati Bengals.

2022 season
On April 29, 2022, the Raiders announced that they would not pick up the fifth-year option on Jacobs' contract, making him a free agent in the 2023 offseason. In Week 4, Jacobs set a career high in yardage in a 23–32 win against the Denver Broncos where he ran for 144 yards and two touchdowns. In the following week against the Kansas City Chiefs, Jacobs ran for a career-high 154 yards on 21 carries in a 30–29 loss. In the next game, against the Houston Texans, he had 20 carries for 143 rushing yards and three rushing touchdowns in the 38–20 victory. In Week 11, against the Broncos, Jacobs had 160 scrimmage yards in the 22–16 victory. The following week against the Seattle Seahawks, Jacobs rushed for 229 yards, and had 74 receiving yards. He finished with a total of 303 scrimmage yards, and two touchdowns in the 40-34 victory, culminating in an 86 yard walk-off touchdown to win the game in overtime. For his performance, Jacobs won AFC Offensive Player of the Week.
Josh Jacobs was the  NFL rushing yards leader with 340 attempts, 1653 yards & 12 TDs. On February 9, 2023, Josh Jacobs was awarded with the NFLs first Jim Brown award at the NFL Honors.

2023 season
On March 6, 2023, the Raiders placed the franchise tag on Jacobs.

NFL career statistics

Regular season

Postseason

Raiders records

Career

 Rushing yards per game: 79.0
 Most rushing yards in first two seasons: 2,215

Rookie

 Most games started: 13
 Most rushing attempts: 242
 Most rushing yards: 1,150
 Most rushing yards per attempt (minimum 6 starts): 4.8
 Most rushing yards per game: 88.5

Personal life
Jacobs' younger brother, Isaiah Jacobs, is a running back for the Maryland Terrapins. Jacobs is of Filipino descent via Angeles City through his paternal grandmother, and has a portrait of her tattooed on his left hand.

References

External links

Las Vegas Raiders bio
Alabama Crimson Tide bio

1998 births
Living people
Sportspeople from Tulsa, Oklahoma
Players of American football from Oklahoma
American football running backs
Alabama Crimson Tide football players
Las Vegas Raiders players
Oakland Raiders players
American Conference Pro Bowl players
Ed Block Courage Award recipients